is a Japanese speed skater. She competed in the women's 1500 metres at the 2002 Winter Olympics.

References

1974 births
Living people
Japanese female speed skaters
Olympic speed skaters of Japan
Speed skaters at the 2002 Winter Olympics
People from Tomakomai, Hokkaido
Universiade bronze medalists for Japan
Universiade medalists in speed skating
Competitors at the 1997 Winter Universiade
20th-century Japanese women
21st-century Japanese women